Miguel García Granados y Zavala (29 September 1809 – 8 September 1878) was a Spanish-born Guatemalan politician and military general who served as President of Guatemala from 1871 to 1873.

Early life 

García Granados was born in El Puerto de Santa María, Spain. As a young adolescent, he was brought to Central America. He was a member of a wealthy military family. At age twenty-three, Granados visited South America, Europe and the cities of New York and Philadelphia in the US. He completed his schooling in London. 

He was the brother of Guatemalan writer María Josefa García Granados.

Career 
García Granados was known as a moderate liberal. He compromised with Rafael Carrera, and attempted to get along with his successor Vicente Cerna. Sympathetic with the revolt against the government, García Granados fled to exile and was supported by Guatemalan liberals. After returning to Guatemala, García Granados became the leader of the revolution against Cerna, eventually becoming known as its philosopher. García Granados played a key part in the regime of Justo Rufino Barrios, the founder of "the army of 45 men". He served as a provisional president from 1871 to 1873 after the liberal victory of Guatemala City. García Granados wanted to regularize the government by constructing a lawful regime. In 1872, Guatemala invaded Honduras, where García Granados decreed freedom of the press and expelled the Jesuits.

García Granados and his successor Barrios support multiple liberal revolts. During his presidency, García Granados created the Guatemalan flag by decree, which remains almost identical to his 1871 version. Garcia Granados supported education and the arts. In 1871 he invited Italian conductor Pietro Visoni to stay in Guatemala and become the director of the main military band. Visoni later founded the Martial Symphony Band and the School of Substitutes (Escuela de Substitutos), the first formal music conservatory in Central America. After García Granados stepped down, Barrios served as president until the mid-1870s.

Retirement 

García Granados retired from public life to write articles for Guatemalan magazines and newspapers; accounts of the time when he was the leader of the liberal forces and as president; an essay about monetary policy and two volumes of memoirs.

In 1877, he arrived in Guatemala José Martí, who started teaching in the just founded Instituto Nacional Central para Varones and Escuela Normal para Varones. In those days, the high schools' faculty included Spaniard politician Valero Pujol, German engineer Edwin Rockstroh and Cuban poet José Joaquín Palma, who used to gather for intellectual conversations. In one of those meetings, Martí met María García Granados y Saborío, general García Granados' daughter. Despite his engagement to a Cuban woman, Martí started visiting the Garcia Granados residency, where he frequently played chess with the general and paid his respects to María. María fell in love with Martí, but after a sudden trip to Mexico in early 1878, came back to Guatemala already married. A few weeks after Marti left for good, María died, followed shortly thereafter by her father. In 1891, Martí wrote a poem in her memory, named La Niña de Guatemala, in which he implies that she died from love.

Death 

Garcia Granados died on 8 September 1878 at the age of 69. Garcia Granaods was laid to rest in the old San Juan de Dios Cemetery. 

In 1894, his remains were transferred to a monument erected in his honor at the new General Cemetery.

His portrait appears on the 10 Quetzales bank note.

See also 
 Rafael Carrera
 Vicente Cerna
 Justo Rufino Barrios
 María Josefa García Granados
 Alejandro M. Sinibaldi
 Manuel Lisandro Barillas
 José Martí

Notes and references

Notes

References

Sources
 Jones, Christopher L. Guatemala: Past and Present. Russell & Russell, 1966
 Rosenthal, Mario. Guatemala: The story of an emergent Latin American Democracy. Twayne, 1962

External links 
 In Spanish: Perfil biográfico
 In Spanish: La Reforma Liberal de 1871

1809 births
1878 deaths
People from El Puerto de Santa María
Liberal Party (Guatemala) politicians
Presidents of Guatemala
Burials in Guatemala
19th-century Guatemalan people
Guatemalan people of Spanish descent